The 1982 Appalachian State Mountaineers football team was an American football team that represented Appalachian State University as a member of the Southern Conference (SoCon) during the 1982 NCAA Division I-AA football season. In their third year under head coach Mike Working, the Mountaineers compiled an overall record of 4–7 with a mark of 3–4 in conference play, tying for fourth in the SoCon.

Schedule

References

Appalachian State
Appalachian State Mountaineers football seasons
Appalachian State Mountaineers football